DSRI may refer to:

 Danish Space Research Institute
 Deep-Sea Research Part I: Oceanographic Research Papers, a scientific journal published by Elsevier
 Defence and Security Research Institute, an institute of the Royal Military College of Canada
 Democratic and Secular Republicans of Iran, a political alliance; see Political parties in Iran
 Dopamine-serotonin reuptake inhibitor, also known as Serotonin-dopamine reuptake inhibitor
Democratic and Secular Republicans of Iran